Gary Gillette is a baseball writer, author, and editor. He is co-editor of both the ESPN Baseball Encyclopedia and the ESPN Football Encyclopedia. For both series of books, he partnered with noted statistician Pete Palmer, as well as writers Sean Lahman and Matt Silverman.

He has been featured as a baseball commentator and analyst for several NPR radio stations, including WHYY-FM in Philadelphia, WKAR in East Lansing, Michigan, and Minnesota Public Radio. He also contributed to NBC Sports 1988 postseason baseball coverage. Gillette served in the role of team leader and lead reporter for Total Sports for the first-ever live pitch-by-pitch baseball Webcasts at the College World Series (1997), at the World Series (1997), and at the MLB All-Star Game (1998).

Gillette works as an expert witness on baseball-related litigation, as a consultant to insurance companies on player contract issues, and as an adviser to player agents on salary arbitration cases.

From 1992 to 1997, Gillette was the president and owner of The Baseball Workshop, which operated a national stringer network covering Major League Baseball while producing and maintaining a unique set of baseball databases.  In 1997, the Baseball Workshop merged with Koz Sports and Baseball Ink to form Total Sports.  Gillette served as vice president of Total Sports from 1997 to 1999.

Beginning in 2005, Gillette has held the title of president for Hidden Game Sports/24-7 Baseball, a sports data research and management agency that represents the proprietors of comprehensive databases for Major League Baseball, Minor League Baseball, Professional Football, Professional Basketball, and Professional Hockey. (24-7 Baseball, L.L.C., became part of Hidden Game Sports in 2012.) These professional-grade sports databases have been licensed to many clients, including major media organizations like ESPN, Sports-Reference.com, SportRadar US, STATS LLC, and SportsTicker. Other clients include tech companies, sports game publishers, professional sports agents, insurance companies, university business schools and medical schools, and nonprofit organizations.

Published works

As an editor 

 Editor-in-chief and designer: The ESPN Baseball Encyclopedia (five editions from Sterling Publishing, 2004–2008)
 Editor-in-chief and designer: The Baseball Encyclopedia (Barnes & Noble Publishing, 2004)
 The ESPN Pro Football Encyclopedia (two editions from Sterling, 2006–2007)
 Editor and creator of the annual Emerald Guide to Baseball, 2007–2015 (nine editions)
 Executive editor and contributor: Calling the Game:Baseball Broadcasting, 1920 to the Present ( Society for American Baseball Research, 2015)
 Editor and contributor: Biographical Encyclopedia of the Negro Baseball Leagues, second edition (to be published in 2021)
 61atFifty.com Web site publisher and editor, 2011
 Editor of Baseball-Reference.com’s Baseball Early Bird daily newsletter, 2008–2009
 Editor and contributing author: Total Baseball Companion series (30 MLB team booklets for Total Sports Publishing, 2000)
 Executive editor of and contributor to Total Baseball Daily, 1996–1999
 Editor of the Baseball Workshop Online on AOL, 1996
 Baseball editor of Motley Fool’s online sports community, 1996
 Editor, The Scouting Report: 1995 and 1996 (HarperCollins)
 Editor, The Great American Baseball Stat Book 1992, 1993, and 1994 editions (HarperCollins)
 Editor and co-author, 1992 Fantasy League Baseball (Publications International)
 Contributing editor, Bill James Presents The Great American Baseball Stat Book (1986 and 1987 editions)

As an author 

 Lead author, Big League Ballparks: The Complete Illustrated History of Major-League Baseball Parks (Metro Books, 2009)
 Baseball columnist for ESPN.com’s MLB Insider, 2005–2006
 Contributor to third through eighth editions of Total Baseball encyclopedia, 1993–2004. (Total Baseball was the official encyclopedia of Major League Baseball from 1995–2003)
 Co-author of "The Changing Game" in the seventh and eighth editions of Total Baseball, 2001 and 2004
 Author of “Going, Going, Gone,”a groundbreaking piece on the history of the home run in the sixth edition of Total Baseball, 1999
 Contributing author, SABR Bio Project (SABR.org)
 Contributing author, Puerto Rico and Baseball: 60 Biographies (SABR, 2017)
 Contributing author, Detroit the Unconquerable (SABR, 2014)
 Contributing author, Bridging Two Dynasties: The 1947 Yankees (University of Nebraska Press, 2013)
 Contributing author, Detroit Tigers 1984: What a Start! What a Finish! (SABR, 2013)
 Contributing author, Sweet ’60: The 1960 Pittsburgh Pirates (SABR, 2013)
 Co-author, “Not Chiseled in Stone: Baseball’s Enduring Records and the SABR Era” in the Baseball Research Journal, Fall 2011
 Contributing editor to SABR.org’s “History of SABR” update, 2011
 Co-author, “Interleague Attendance Boost Mostly a Mirage” in SABR’s Baseball Research Journal, 2006
 Contributing author, Baseball . . . The Perfect Game: An All-Star Anthology Celebrating the Games’ Greatest Players, Teams, and Moments (Voyageur Press, 2005)
 Contributing author, Baseball: The Biographical Encyclopedia (Total Sports Publishing, 2000)
 Contributor to the best-selling annual Baseball Prospectus book and BaseballProspectus.com (2002–2008)
 Contributor to annual editions of the Baseball Weekly Almanac (1992–2000)
 Co-author, Baseball Weekly Insider 1999 & 2000 (Total Sports)
 Author, The Spy: Baseball '98 (Total Sports)
 Contributor to Sports Illustrated Online, 1996–1999

As a book consultant 

 Ballparks consultant on Roger Kahn’s book Rickey & Robinson, 2014

Baseball preservation efforts 
In 2012, Gillette founded Friends of Historic Hamtramck Stadium, a nonprofit organization dedicated to restoring and preserving historic Hamtramck Stadium, ensuring its future through educational, cultural, and recreational programming honoring the history of Negro league baseball and amateur sports in Hamtramck and Detroit. Gillette has served in the role of president/chair. He led the effort to have Hamtramck Stadium listed on the National Register of Historic Places in 2012 and to have a State of Michigan Historic Marker placed at the site in 2014. Currently, the organization is raising money for renovation of Hamtramck Stadium. Hamtramck Stadium was the recipient of a 2017 National Park Service African American Civil Rights Grant and a 2020 African American Cultural Heritage grant, both based upon detailed historical research undertaken by Gillette.

From 2007-2017, he served as an officer and director of the nonprofit Old Tiger Stadium Conservancy. At first, the nonprofit organization was involved in the struggle to save Tiger Stadium, and then shifted its efforts to the redevelopment of the site of the historic field at the corner of Michigan and Trumbull in Detroit.

Other distinctions 
Gillette organized, hosted, and served as a panelist at the Detroit Negro Leagues Centennial Symposium, held in 2020. He is honored as an elector on the Sports Panel of the National Polish-American Sports Hall of Fame, a service he has performed since 2006.

References

External links
Friends of Historic Hamtramck Stadium
National Polish-American Sports Hall of Fame

 

Living people
American sportswriters
Baseball writers
Year of birth missing (living people)
Place of birth missing (living people)